The Goulds Pumps/ITT Industries 200 was a NASCAR Busch Series race held at Nazareth Speedway in Nazareth, Pennsylvania. Originally a 300 lap race, it was added to the Busch Series schedule in 1988 and last run in 2004, after the owners, International Speedway Corporation, closed the facility. The race was replaced with the Zippo 200 at Watkins Glen, another ISC-owned track.

Tim Fedewa and Ron Hornaday Jr. are the only two drivers with multiple wins in this race, both winning the event twice.

After the closure of the track, the Xfinity Series would return to racing in Pennsylvania when Pocono Raceway held its inaugural Xfinity Series event, the Pocono Green 250 in 2016. It was won by Kyle Larson after it was shortened by rain showers after just 53 of the scheduled 100 laps. Elliott Sadler was the only former Nazareth winner to start that race.

Past winners 

1999: Race shortened due to darkness after a five-hour rain delay.

References

External links
 

Former NASCAR races
NASCAR Xfinity Series races